The canton of Gaillon is an administrative division of the Eure department, northern France. Its borders were modified at the French canton reorganisation which came into effect in March 2015. Its seat is in Gaillon.

It consists of the following communes:

Ailly
Autheuil-Authouillet
Cailly-sur-Eure
Champenard
Clef-Vallée-d'Eure
Courcelles-sur-Seine
Fontaine-Bellenger
Gaillon
Heudreville-sur-Eure
Saint-Aubin-sur-Gaillon
Saint-Étienne-sous-Bailleul
Saint-Julien-de-la-Liègue
Saint-Pierre-de-Bailleul
Saint-Pierre-la-Garenne
Les Trois Lacs
Le Val-d'Hazey
Villers-sur-le-Roule

References

Cantons of Eure